Transitional Voices is a live album by Clock DVA, released in 1990 by Interfisch Records.

Track listing

Personnel 
Adapted from the Transitional Voices liner notes.

Clock DVA
Robert Baker – instruments
Dean Dennis – instruments
Adi Newton – instruments, vocals

Production and additional personnel
Michael Bulgrin – design
Andrew McKenzie – engineering, mixing

Release history

References

External links 
 

1990 live albums
Clock DVA albums